El dolor de amar is a Mexican telenovela directed by Jesús Valero for Telesistema Mexicano in 1966. Is a remake of telenovela Senda prohibida (1958).

Cast 
Elvira Quintana as Olga
Patricia Morán
Augusto Benedico
Aurora Alvarado as Clemen
Mercedes Pascual
Alejandro Ciangherotti
Andrea Cotto
Enrique García Álvarez
Amparo Villegas
Emilio Brillas
Kika Meyer

References

External links 

Mexican telenovelas
1966 telenovelas
Televisa telenovelas
Spanish-language telenovelas
1966 Mexican television series debuts
1966 Mexican television series endings